Hjalmar Levin (14 June 1884 – 8 March 1983) was a Swedish cyclist. He competed in two events at the 1912 Summer Olympics.

References

External links
 

1884 births
1983 deaths
Swedish male cyclists
Olympic cyclists of Sweden
Cyclists at the 1912 Summer Olympics
People from Eskilstuna
Sportspeople from Södermanland County